Al Ittihad Al Ichtiraki ( meaning The Socialist Union) is a daily Moroccan Arabic-language newspaper.

History and profile
Al Ittihad Al Ichtiraki was first published in May 1983. It is the successor to Al Muharrir (The Editor in English) which was shut down in June 1981.

The paper is the organ of the Socialist Union of Popular Forces party. Its sister paper is the francophone newspaper Libération. Mohammad Brini served as the director of Al Ittihad Al Ichtiraki which is based in Casablanca.

The 2001 circulation of the paper was 110,000 copies, making it the largest daily in Morocco. It dropped to 65,000 copies in 2003.

During the war in Iraq Al Ittihad Al Ichtiraki added "No War" in English to the banner of each page which included Iraq-oriented news.

See also
 List of newspapers in Morocco

References

External links
 Official website

1983 establishments in Morocco
Arabic-language newspapers
Mass media in Casablanca
I
Publications established in 1983
Socialist newspapers